TER Franche-Comté was the regional rail network serving the Franche-Comté région, France. In 2017 it was merged into the new TER Bourgogne-Franche-Comté.

Since the convention signed in 2002 for a duration of 5 years, between Jean-François Humbert, then president of the Regional council of Franche-Comté and Noël Belin, then regional director of the SNCF, the regional council of Franche-Comté is the organising authority of regional transports. A new agreement, signed on 21 December 2006, by Raymond Forni, president of the Conseil Régional de Franche-Comté and Josiane Beaud, regional directeur of the SNCF, en présence d'Anne-Marie Idrac, présidente of the SNCF, from 2007–2012.

TER railway connections

The two lines Dijon–Dole–Besançon and Besançon–Montbéliard–Belfort essentially form one line, called the Saône–Doubs line. It constitutes the backbone of trips in Franche-Comté with 60% of the passengers and 60% of the Gross profit. It's along this route that the line bypasses highwayss, canals and other railways.
 The Revermont line: Besançon–Lons-le-Saunier–Bourg-en-Bresse. Second line by its importance, is, for a large part, a single track (between Saint-Amour and Mouchard).
Besançon–Morteau–La Chaux-de-Fonds : this line has been certified by French normes in 2005. The trains on this line are usually done with SNCF Class X 73500 and SNCF Class X 2800, though occasionally they are upgraded to SNCF Class XR 6200.
Belfort–Épinal
Dijon–Pontarlier
Dole–Saint-Claude: this line is called the ligne des hirondelles (line of swallows)
Montbéliard–Belfort–Vesoul
Morez–Bourg-en-Bresse–Lyon

Rolling stock

Multiple units
 SNCF Class Z 9500
 SNCF Class Z 9600
 SNCF Class X 2800+ trailers SNCF Class XR 6000
 SNCF Class X 4750
 SNCF Class X 73500
 SNCF Class X 76500 (also called: XGC X 76500)
 SNCF Class Z 27500 (also called: ZGC Z 27500)

Locomotives
 SNCF Class BB 22200
 SNCF Class BB 25500

See also
SNCF
Transport express régional
Réseau Ferré de France
List of SNCF stations in Franche-Comté

External links
 TER Franche-Comté website
Map of the Network